Hibbertia scabrifolia is a species of flowering plant in the family Dilleniaceae and is endemic to the Northern Kimberley region of Western Australia. It is a shrub with low-lying branches, linear leaves and yellow flowers usually arranged singly near the ends of branches, usually with 20 to 22 stamens arranged in bundles around two densely scaly carpels.

Description
The lower surface of the leaves is densely hairy.

Taxonomy
Hibbertia scabrifolia was first formally described in 2010 by Hellmut R. Toelken in the Journal of the Adelaide Botanic Gardens from specimens collected on Theda Station in 1985. The specific epithet (scabrifolia) means "rough-leaved".

Distribution and habitat
This hibbertia grows eucalypt woodland in the Northern Kimberley region of northern Western Australia.

Conservation status
Hibbertia scabrifolia is classified as "not threatened" by the Government of Western Australia Department of Parks and Wildlife.

See also
List of Hibbertia species

References

scabrifolia
Flora of Western Australia
Plants described in 2010
Taxa named by Hellmut R. Toelken